The Native Language Immersion Student Achievement Act, S. 1948 was introduced on Jan 16, 2014. Its sponsor is Sen. Jon Tester [D-MT]. Cosponsors were Max Baucus [D-MT], Mark Begich [D-AK], Tim Johnson [D-SD], Brian Schatz [D-HI], Tom Udall [D-NM], and Lisa Murkowski [R-AK].

The bill "would amend the Elementary and Secondary Education Act of 1965 to provide increased federal financial support to Native American language programs at American Indian-focused schools." In 2015, the bill would provide $5 million in funding.

Support among Native Americans includes Oglala Sioux Tribal president Bryan Brewer and Rosebud Sioux Tribal president Cyril Scott. Congressional supporters include Senator John Walsh (D-MT).

See also 
Esther Martinez Native American Languages Preservation Act
Language nest
Language immersion
Language education in the United States
Less Commonly Taught Languages
Indigenous languages of the Americas

References

External links 
Text of S. 1948 as introduced

United States federal education legislation
United States federal Native American legislation
Native American culture
Native American schools
Native American language revitalization
Language education in the United States
Language immersion
Indigenous languages of the Americas